Jack Roslovic (born January 29, 1997) is an American professional ice hockey player for the Columbus Blue Jackets of the National Hockey League (NHL). He was selected in the first round, 25th overall by the Winnipeg Jets in the 2015 NHL Entry Draft.

Playing career

Amateur
Roslovic played minor ice hockey with the Easton Youth Hockey Association (EYHA) Ice Dragons and the Ohio AAA Blue Jackets. He participated in the 2010 Quebec International Pee-Wee Hockey Tournament with the AAA Blue Jackets.  Roslovic played the 2013–14 and 2014–15 seasons in the United States Hockey League (USHL) as a member of the USA Hockey National Team Development Program (U.S. NTDP).  Roslovic's outstanding play was rewarded when he was invited to skate in the 2014 CCM/USA Hockey All-American Prospects Game.  He played 25 games for Team USA in the 2014–15 USHL season, accumulating 11 goals and 38 points.

Roslovic committed to play the 2015–16 season with the Miami University RedHawks. Before joining them, Roslovic was selected by the Winnipeg Jets in the first round, 25th overall, in the 2015 NHL Entry Draft. He skated in 36 games for the RedHawks during the 2015–16 season, recording 26 points. On July 18, 2016, the Jets signed Roslovic to a three-year, entry-level contract.

Professional

Winnipeg Jets
Roslovic joined the Jets' American Hockey League (AHL) affiliate, the Manitoba Moose, for the 2016–17 season. On April 3, 2017, the Jets recalled him. Roslovic made his NHL debut on April 6 in a 5–4 win over his hometown Columbus Blue Jackets. He was reassigned to the Moose the following day. Roslovic led the Moose in scoring for the season with 48 points in 65 games.

Roslovic once again began the 2017–18 season with the Moose. On December 30, 2017, he received a recall from the Jets. On January 25, 2018, Roslovic scored his first career NHL goal in a 4–3 loss to the Anaheim Ducks. He finished the season with five goals and 14 points in 31 games.

Roslovic began the 2018–19 season with the Jets. On February 2, 2019, he scored his first career hat-trick in a 9–3 win over the Ducks, with all of his goals coming on the power play. With six points in four games, he was named the league's first star of the week ending February 4. Roslovic finished his first full season with the Jets with 24 points in 77 games.

Columbus Blue Jackets
Following the 2019–20 season, Roslovic became a restricted free agent. His agent, Claude Lemieux, confirmed he wanted to be traded. Without a new contract, Roslovic sat out the Jets' training camp as well as the beginning of the 2020–21 season.

On January 23, 2021, the Jets traded Roslovic, alongside Patrik Laine, to his hometown Columbus Blue Jackets in exchange for Pierre-Luc Dubois and 2022 third-round pick. He immediately signed a two-year, $3.8 million contract. Roslovic had a successful first season in Columbus, finishing with a career high 34 points in just 48 games.

International play

Roslovic helped lead Team USA to a gold medal at the 2014 World U-17 Hockey Challenge. He also won a gold medal as a member of Team USA at the 2015 IIHF World U18 Championships, where he was individually honored as one of the Top Three Players on his team.

Career statistics

Regular season and playoffs

International

Awards and honors

References

External links

1997 births
Living people
American men's ice hockey centers
Columbus Blue Jackets players
Ice hockey players from Ohio
Manitoba Moose players
Miami RedHawks men's ice hockey players
National Hockey League first-round draft picks
USA Hockey National Team Development Program players
Winnipeg Jets draft picks
Winnipeg Jets players